"Hand of Doom" is a song by the English heavy metal band Black Sabbath, originally appearing on their second album Paranoid, released in 1970.

Background
The song was conceived after the band had observed a growing number of US soldiers arriving in England from the Vietnam War in the late 1960s with severe drug addictions. The song paints an unflattering picture of hard drug use. The lyrics were written by Geezer Butler while the music is credited to the entire band.

Cover versions
The song has been covered by various bands, including:
Slayer on the 2000 Black Sabbath tribute album, Nativity in Black II.
Danzig on its 1996 album, Blackacidevil, and on the Black Sabbath fan compilation, Nativity in Black III, based on the tribute albums Nativity in Black I and II.
Isis on its 1999 EP, Sawblade.
Eyehategod on a split album with Anal Cunt.
Orange Goblin on a split with Electric Wizard.
HIM as one of their B-sides on the single The Funeral of Hearts, and on their 2007 compilation album, Uneasy Listening Vol. 2.
Reverend on its 1990 debut album World Won't Miss You.
Jazz Sabbath on its 2020 self-titled debut album.

Personnel
Black Sabbath
Ozzy Osbourne – vocals
Tony Iommi – guitars
Geezer Butler – bass guitar
Bill Ward – drums

In popular culture
Melissa Auf der Maur, known for her work with Hole and The Smashing Pumpkins, was the leader of a Black Sabbath cover band named after this song. 
The song was used in a scene in the fourteenth episode of the first season of Elementary, originally aired on February 3, 2013.

References

External links

1970 songs
Black Sabbath songs
Songs about drugs
Songs written by Tony Iommi
Songs written by Geezer Butler
Songs written by Bill Ward (musician)
Songs written by Ozzy Osbourne